Christ College (Autonomous), Irinjalakuda is a Syro Malabar Catholic Church college run by Carmelites of Mary Immaculate (CMI) in Irinjalakuda of Thrissur District, Kerala, India. Christ College is affiliated to The University of Calicut. It has become the first college in Thrissur district to be accredited with an "A++" Grade certificate by the National Assessment and Accreditation Council (NAAC). The college conducts several undergraduate and postgraduate courses in arts, commerce, and science faculties. Besides, the college offers professional courses like PG diploma in natural disaster management; Bachelor of Physical Education (BPEd), and some UGC sponsored short-term courses. The College has 4800+ Students and 200+ Faculties. There are 53 Ug & Pg Programs and 4 Research Centres in the College.

History
Christ College was started in 1956, by the Devamatha Province of the Carmelites of Mary Immaculate (CMI), an indigenous religious congregation founded in 1831 by St. Kuriakose Elias Chavara, a religious priest and versatile genius, who envisioned education as a tool for liberation and development.
Christ College has its origin at Mangadikunnu, then a forlorn hill on the outskirts of Irinjalakuda Municipality. The college was inaugurated by Burgula Ramakrishna Rao, then Governor of Kerala on 13 October 1957. The college started with 240 students and 14 members on the teaching staff. The first Manager of the college was Rev. Fr. Clemens CMI and the first Principal was Rev. Fr. Gabriel Chiramel CMI. In the beginning, the college was affiliated to the University of Kerala until 1968, when it came under the jurisdiction of the University of Calicut.

Notable alumni
K. Satchidanandan
P. Jayachandran
K. Radhakrishnan
P. N. Vinayachandran
Kochouseph Chittilappilly
Dr. V. P. Gangadharan
Mala Aravindan
Joju George
Kamal (director)
T. V. Chandran
T. P. Senkumar
M. P. Vincent
Mani C. Kappan
Edavela Babu
Jiju Asokan
Viswanathan Manikan
Tom Emmatty
P. Rajeeve
C. R. Neelakandan
Jijoy Rajagopal
Aditi Ravi
Sowmya Menon
Lakshmi Nakshathra
Malavika Menon

Notable faculty
 K. Satchidanandan
 Fr. Gabriel Chiramel CMI
 Dr. A. V. George

In popular culture
Movies shot at Christ College, Irinjalakuda, include:
 Niram
 Puthiya Mugam
 Ishtam
 Vaadamalli
 Manathodu Mazhaikalam
 Pokkiri Raja
 Apoorvaragam
 Mazhavilkoodaram
 Dosth
 July 4
 D Company
 Mazhathullikkilukkam
 Twenty:20

See also
St. Joseph's College, Irinjalakuda
St. Thomas College, Thrissur
Vimala College
University of Calicut

References

External links

Official Website of Christ College, Irinjalakuda

Catholic universities and colleges in India
Colleges affiliated with the University of Calicut
Universities and colleges in Thrissur district
Irinjalakuda
Educational institutions established in 1956
1956 establishments in Kerala
Arts and Science colleges in Kerala
Colleges in Thrissur
1956 establishments in India